The Lion Men is a Singapore action comedy film directed by Jack Neo and starring Tosh Zhang, Wang Weiliang, Eva Cheng, Noah Yap, Charlie Goh, Maxi Lim and Chen Tianwen. The main plot revolves around two lion dance groups pitting themselves against each other.

Cast
 Tosh Zhang as Shishen/Supreme
 Wang Weiliang as Mikey
 Eva Cheng as Xiao Yu
 Noah Yap as Zhang Bu Da
 Charlie Goh as Ah Qiang
 Maxi Lim as Babyface
 Chen Tianwen as Master He

Plot
Shi Shen (Tosh Zhang) is the top performer in the Tiger Crane Lion Dance Association, but feels restricted by Master He's (Chen Tianwen) traditional mindset. He decides to take a group of disciples and forms his own lion dance troupe, which fuses hip hop and rock with lion dance movements.

A major Lion Dance Competition is coming up and Mikey (Wang Weiliang) is groomed to be Shi Shen's successor. However, he has a huge fear of heights! The situation worsens when both Shi Shen and Mikey fall for Master He's daughter (Eva Cheng).

Production
Development of The Lion Men was first announced in June 2013 as an untitled project hailed as the "breakthrough action movie" of director Jack Neo. In August 2013, the film's title was revealed during its opening ceremony, with Neo adding that he had been thinking of such a film premise for "quite some time ago". The budget of the film is estimated to be around $4 million. To prepare for the film, the stars had to undergo real life lion dancing training sessions.

Release
The Lion Men was released on 30 January 2014, the day before Chinese New Year.

References

2014 films
Films directed by Jack Neo
Singaporean multilingual films